Brachyleptura rubrica is a species of beetle in the family Cerambycidae. It was described by Thomas Say in 1824. It feeds on various Spiraea species.

References

Lepturinae
Beetles described in 1824
Taxa named by Thomas Say